The 1994 Eastern Illinois Panthers football team represented Eastern Illinois University during the 1994 NCAA Division I-AA football season. The Panthers played their home games at O'Brien Stadium in Charleston, Illinois.

Schedule

References

Eastern Illinois
Eastern Illinois Panthers football seasons
Eastern Illinois Panthers football